The one hour run is an athletics event in which competitors try to cover as much distance as possible within one hour. While officially recognized by World Athletics as a track event, it is rarely contested apart from occasional world record attempts.

The event has a long history, with first recorded races dating back to the late 17th century.
The first athlete to run more than 20 kilometers in one hour was Emil Zátopek, in September 1951. Zátopek also set the 20,000 meters world record in the same race. Since that time, most men's 20,000 m world records were also set en route to one hour world records.

Both were set on 4 September 2020 during the 2020 Diamond League Ivo Van Damme Memorial.

Men's world record progression

Women's world record progression

All-time top 25

Men
Updated September 2022.

Women
Updated September 2020.
Mx = Mixed gender race

References

External links
IAAF list of one-hour records in XML

Events in track and field
Long-distance running